P. minuta  may refer to:
 Plethodontohyla minuta, a frog species endemic to Madagascar
 Pseudis minuta, a frog species found in Argentina, Brazil and Uruguay

See also
 Minuta